Ana Antonijević (born August 26, 1987) is a female professional volleyball player from Serbia. She was a member of the Serbia women's national volleyball team that won the gold medal at the 2011 European Championship in Serbia and Italy.

Achievements

Clubs
  Switzerland volleyball league (1): 2007/08
  Serbian volleyball league (1): 2008/09
  French volleyball league (4): 2009/10, 2010/11, 2011/12, 2012/13, 2013/14
  Serbian Volleyball Cup (2): 2002/03, 2008/09
 Switzerland Volleyball Cup (1): 2008/09
  French Volleyball Cup (5): 2009/10, 2010/11, 2011/12, 2012/13, 2013/14

External links
 Ana Antonijević at the International Volleyball Federation
 

1987 births
Living people
Sportspeople from Užice
Serbian women's volleyball players
European champions for Serbia
Serbian expatriate sportspeople in Switzerland
Serbian expatriate sportspeople in France
Serbian expatriate sportspeople in Romania
Expatriate volleyball players in Switzerland
Expatriate volleyball players in France
Expatriate volleyball players in Romania
Universiade medalists in volleyball
Universiade silver medalists for Serbia
Medalists at the 2007 Summer Universiade
Medalists at the 2009 Summer Universiade